Kep Chuktema (born 7 February 1951) is the former governor and mayor of the Municipality of Phnom Penh.

Conflicts
Under Kep Chuktema's tenure, about 100,000 Phnom Penh residents have been displaced to relocation sites in and around Phnom Penh where access to employment, education healthcare and clean water is often limited. The municipality over the past ten years has failed to tackle the rate at which the population is growing. The city today faces more gridlock with the rise of population growth at 7.5% each year.

In March, Prime Minister Hun Sen expressed concern for the failing state of Phnom Penh’s infrastructure during a meeting with the visiting mayor of Paris. He said the city's expansion had led to electricity shortages, traffic jams, trash problems and an inadequate water supply system.

Chuktema is best remembered for the widely unpopular filling in of Boeung Kak lake and the violent land evictions there and at the Borei Keila community, whose landless residents continue to protest regularly in Phnom Penh.

References 

Living people
Governors of Phnom Penh
Mayors of places in Cambodia
1951 births
Members of the National Assembly (Cambodia)
People from Phnom Penh